The Two Brothers is a 1910 American short silent Western film directed by  D. W. Griffith.

Cast

 Arthur V. Johnson as Jose
 Dell Henderson as Manuel
 Kate Bruce as The Mother
 Marion Leonard as Red Rose
 Charles West as A Suitor / A Mexican
 Henry B. Walthall as Pedro
 W. Chrystie Miller as Priest
 Art Acord
 Linda Arvidson as Mexican
 Florence Barker as Mexican
 Gertrude Claire as Mexican
 Hoot Gibson
 George Nichols
 Anthony O'Sullivan as Mexican
 Alfred Paget as Mexican
 Mary Pickford as Mexican
 Billy Quirk as Mexican
 Mack Sennett as One of Pedro's Men
 Dorothy West as Mexican

See also
 List of American films of 1910
 Hoot Gibson filmography
 D. W. Griffith filmography
 Mary Pickford filmography

References

External links
 

1910 films
1910 Western (genre) films
1910 short films
American silent short films
American black-and-white films
Biograph Company films
Films directed by D. W. Griffith
Silent American Western (genre) films
1910s American films
1910s English-language films